Kinta is a town in Haskell County, Oklahoma, United States.  The population was 297 at the 2010 census, an increase of 22.2 percent over the figure of 243 recorded in 2000.

History
Kinta was founded in 1901 by George W. Scott, son-in-law of Greenwood McCurtain, the last chief of the Choctaw Nation before Oklahoma became a state. Scott named the town for nearby Beaver Creek, the name Kinta being the Choctaw word for "beaver."  He moved his store to Kinta from San Bois, established a post office in his store, and built the first permanent building in town in 1903.  San Bois was then the Choctaw capital, but had been bypassed by the Fort Smith and Western Railroad.

At the time of its founding, Kinta was located in the Moshulatubbee District of the Choctaw Nation.

During the first three decades of the 20th century, the town economy was supported by coal mining and the production of wood products. When these two industries declined sharply in the 1930s, the railroad ceased operations. The town nearly failed with them. The town survived somehow, and by the start of the 21st century, the major employer was the Kinta Public School System.

Geography
Kinta is located at  (35.120875, -95.238683).

Demographics
As of the census of 2000, there were 243 people, 104 households, and 68 families residing in the town. There were 131 housing units at an average density of 209.3 per square mile (80.3/km2). The racial makeup of the town was 82.72% White, 12.35% Native American, 0.41% from other races, and 4.53% from two or more races. Hispanic or Latino of any race were 0.82% of the population.

There were 104 households, out of which 26.9% had children under the age of 18 living with them, 55.8% were married couples living together, 6.7% had a female householder with no husband present, and 33.7% were non-families. 29.8% of all households were made up of individuals, and 20.2% had someone living alone who was 65 years of age or older. The average household size was 2.34 and the average family size was 2.91.

In the town, the population was spread out, with 22.6% under the age of 18, 9.5% from 18 to 24, 25.1% from 25 to 44, 22.6% from 45 to 64, and 20.2% who were 65 years of age or older. The median age was 39 years. For every 100 females, there were 92.9 males. For every 100 females age 18 and over, there were 77.4 males.

The median income for a household in the town was $26,111, and the median income for a family was $32,083. Males had a median income of $25,625 versus $13,750 for females. The per capita income for the town was $13,960. About 8.5% of families and 10.3% of the population were below the poverty line, including 3.2% of those under the age of eighteen and 33.3% of those 65 or over.

Notable people
Green McCurtain (1848–1910), Principal Chief of the Choctaw Nation (1896-1900 and 1902-1910)
Les Feldick (1927- ), Televangelist minister, Founder of Through the Bible with Les Feldick

Notes

References

External links
 Kinta, Haskell County Independent News
 Encyclopedia if Oklahoma History & Culture

Towns in Haskell County, Oklahoma
Towns in Oklahoma